Alfred William Watts (born 5 April 1859 in Millbrook, Hampshire; date of death unknown) was an English first-class cricketer.

Watts represented Hampshire in two first-class matches in 1882, against Somerset and the Marylebone Cricket Club.

Watts date of death is unknown.

External links
Alfred Watts at Cricinfo
Alfred Watts at CricketArchive

1859 births
Cricketers from Southampton
English cricketers
Hampshire cricketers
Year of death missing